Gäddede is a locality in Strömsund Municipality, Jämtland County, Sweden with 401 inhabitants in 2010. Gäddede is located a mere  from the Norway-Sweden border.

Climate
The Swedish weather service (SMHI) operates a weather station in Gäddede. As a result, the effects on the local climate is greater than further inland or on the east coast. The maritime air often blocks continental air during summers, causing chilly temperatures. During some winters however, temperatures hover just below freezing when low-pressure systems are strong. Due to winter precipitation being high, Gäddede has a predictable snow cover for several months.

Even so, Gäddede is below the tree line by a sizeable margin.

See also
Munsvattnet

References 

Populated places in Strömsund Municipality
Jämtland